Alast ( and Arabic) may refer to:
 Alast-e Olya
 Alast-e Sofla
 The "day of Alast" ("Am I not your Lord?”), verse 172 of Sura 7 of the Quran: see Covenant (religion)#Islam